"Hostage of Love" is the second single from Razorlight's third studio album, Slipway Fires,  released on 12 January 2009.

The song featured biblical imagery running throughout the song, as during the songwriting process for Slipway Fires, Borrell was said to have been "learning a bit about Catholicism [and] was very interested in the concept that we’re ordinary sinners."

The music video is in black and white and depicts the band playing the song in a studio, though an alternative version has more recently appeared, with scenes evoking the religious themes mentioned above and also showing band travelling on the Paris Métro, ending at the station Boissière, whose name originates from the custom of remembering the crucifixion by hanging up boxwood on Palm Sunday.

Commercial performance 
In contrast to the lead single "Wire to Wire" which charted at #5 on the Official UK Singles Chart and charted in several other countries, indicating a continuation of the band's large success after their #1 hit "America", "Hostage of Love" was a commercial flop, having only charted at #69 in Germany. This was the last time the band would chart as of 2022. In spite of the band's efforts to promote the single, it failed to enter the UK Singles Chart. As a result, a planned third single release of "Burberry Blue Eyes" was cancelled.

Track listing 

 "Hostage Of Love" - 3:44
 "Wire To Wire" (WDR2 Acoustic Session Version) - 3:04
 "In The Morning" (Live) - 3:59

Chart performance

References

2009 singles
Razorlight songs
Songs written by Johnny Borrell
Songs written by Andy Burrows
2008 songs